The Great Falls Americans are a USA Hockey-sanctioned Tier III Junior A ice hockey team from Great Falls, Montana, playing at the Great Falls IcePlex in the North American 3 Hockey League (NA3HL). The players, ages 16–20, carry amateur status under Junior A guidelines and hope to earn a place on a Canadian major junior, collegiate or minor professional team.

History
The Americans were founded in 2011 as an expansion team scheduled to be part of the Northern Pacific Hockey League (NorPac) for the 2011–12 season. Instead, the team joined the rest of the eastern NorPac teams in creating the new American West Hockey League (AWHL).

In March 2014, the AWHL joined the North American 3 Hockey League as the Frontier Division for the 2014–15 season.

Season-by-season records

References

External links
 official web site

Ice hockey teams in Montana
Ice hockey clubs established in 2011
American West Hockey League teams
2011 establishments in Montana
Sports in Great Falls, Montana